A mandorla is an almond-shaped aureola, i.e. a frame that surrounds the totality of an iconographic figure. It is usually synonymous with vesica, a lens shape. Mandorlas often surround the figures of Jesus Christ and the Virgin Mary in traditional Christian iconography. It is distinguished from a halo in that it encircles the entire body and not just the head. It is commonly used to frame the figure of Christ in Majesty in early medieval and Romanesque art, as well as Byzantine art of the same periods. It is the shape generally used for mediaeval ecclesiastical seals, secular seals generally being round.

Depictions
Mandorla is Italian for the almond nut, to which shape it refers. It may be elliptical or depicted as a vesica, a lens shape as the intersection of two circles. Rhombic mandorlas are also sometimes depicted.

In icons of the Eastern Orthodox Church, the mandorla is used to depict sacred moments that transcend time and space, such as the Resurrection and the Transfiguration of Jesus Christ and the Dormition of the Theotokos. These mandorla often are painted in several concentric bands of different color, which become darker in progression to the center of the mandorla. This accords with the church's use of apophatic theology, as described by Dionysius the Areopagite and others: as holiness increases, only increasing darkness can depict the luminance and brightness thereof.

In architectural iconography, the frame of the mandorla is often marked with decorative mouldings. The interior of the mandorla is usually undecorated, but may contain the symbols for Alpha and Omega (Α and Ω) or, less frequently, depictions of a starry sky or clouds.

In a famous Catholic Romanesque fresco of Jesus Christ in Glory in Sant Climent de Taüll, the scriptural inscription Ego Sum Lux Mundi ("I Am the Light of the World") is incorporated in the mandorla design.

The tympanum at Conques has Christ, with a gesture carved in Romanesque sculpture, indicate the angels at his feet bearing candlesticks. Six surrounding stars that resemble blooming flowers, indicate the planets that were known at the time, including the Moon. Here the symbolism evokes Christ as the Sun.

In one special case, at Cervon (Nièvre), Jesus Christ is seated and surrounded by eight stars that resemble blooming flowers. At Conques the flowers are six-petalled. At Cervon, where the almond motif is repeated in the rim of the mandorla, they are five-petalled, as are true almond flowers, which are the first flowers to bloom after Winter, even before vernation of the leaves of the tree. The symbolism of the nine-branched Chanukkiyah candelabrum may be relevant. In the 12th century a great school of Judaic thought radiated from Narbonne, coinciding with the origins of the Kabbalah. Furthermore, at Cervon the eight stars/flowers only are six-petalled: the "Root of David", the "Morningstar", mentioned at the end of the Book of Revelation (22: 16). In one of the oldest manuscripts of the complete Hebrew Bible, the Leningrad Codex, the Star of David is embedded in an octagon.

In the symbolism of Saint Hildegard of Bingen OSB the mandorla symbolizes the Cosmos.

References

Christian art